Rugula may refer to:

Arugula, an edible plant Eruca sativa
Rugelach, a Jewish pastry